The Grand Council of Valais (German: Grosser Rat) is the legislature of the canton of Valais, in Switzerland.  Valais has a unicameral legislature.

Electoral system 
Members of the Grand Council of Valais are elected every four years. The Grand Council has 130 seats, elected through six multi-member constituencies via open-list proportional representation and preferential voting. 

An additional 130 "substitute members" are elected, on separate lists, whose role it is to replace members who cannot make it to the meetings of the Grand Council.

2021 election 
In the last election, on 7 March 2021, the Christian Democratic People's Party (PDC/CVP), which has been in power since 1857, remained the largest party, but with a historically low number of seats. The Green Party and the Social Democratic Party (PS/SP), which allied with the Christian Social Party (PCS) in Romand Valais and with the Greens in Upper Valais, gained several seats.

The classical liberal FDP.The Liberals and the national conservative Swiss People's Party remained the second- and third-largest parties, respectively.

External links
  Grand Council of Valais official website

Valais
Politics of Valais
Valais